
Athens Academy may refer to:

Organisations 
Platonic Academy - the Academy founded by Plato
Academy of Athens (modern) - Greece's national academy
Athens Academy (school) - a private school in Oconee County, Georgia
 Athens Female Academy - the original name of the institution in Alabama now called Athens State University

Geography 
 two neighbourhoods of Athens, in Greece:
 Akadimia, named after the modern Academy
 Akadimia Platonos, named after Plato's Academy
 Akadimias Street, a central thoroughfare in Athens, near the modern Academy

Other 
 , 2006 movie by Filippos Tsitos, named after the Athens neighbourhood

See also
Academy (disambiguation)
Athens (disambiguation)